Somdet Phra Ariyavangsagatayana, also known as Ariyavangsagatayana VI, was the 16th Somdet Phra Sangharaja 1965–1971 (2508–2514 Thai calendar). He was born in 1897 as Juan Sirisom in Ratchaburi Province. He also served as the abbot of Wat Makut until he died in 1971. His predecessor was Ariyavangsagatayana (Yoo Ñāṇodayo) and his successor was Ariyavangsagatayana (Pun Puṇṇasiri).

External links
 Photo of the patriarch

Buddhism in Thailand
1897 births
1971 deaths
Thai Theravada Buddhist monks
Supreme Patriarchs of Thailand
People from Ratchaburi province
Road incident deaths in Thailand
20th-century Buddhist monks